Abdul Keita may refer to:

 Abdul Kader Keïta, Ivorian footballer
 Abdul Aziz Keita, Guinean footballer